The Queen's Gallery is an art gallery in Edinburgh, Scotland. It forms part of the Palace of Holyroodhouse complex. It was opened in 2002 by Queen Elizabeth II, and exhibits works from the Royal Collection. 

It is open to the public daily. The building is Category B listed.

History 
The Queen's Gallery is housed primarily in a Gothic building that was originally built between 1846 and 1850 as Holyrood Free Church, a parish church of the Free Church of Scotland then, from 1900, of the United Free Church of Scotland). The church was last used for worship in 1915, when it became a redundant church. Prior to its conversion to become the Queen's Gallery the church building was used as a storeroom. The Gallery also comprises the neo-Jacobean building which housed the former Free Church School, which was built at the same time as the church. The building of the church and the school was funded by Elizabeth Gordon, Duchess of Gordon, who was an early supporter of the Free Church. The former school was converted into accommodation for the palace's chauffeurs in the 1920s. In 2002, the buildings were converted to form the Queen's Gallery under plans by Benjamin Tindall Architects. The gallery is primarily housed on the first floor in a large space with an open timber roof.

In 2019, former SNP MP George Kerevan suggested that the gallery building should be moved or demolished to create an uninterrupted 'Freedom square' between Holyrood Palace and the Scottish Parliament Building.

Exhibitions
The gallery houses temporary exhibitions throughout the year that are drawn from the Royal Collection. Past exhibitions have included:

  2022 – Masterpieces from Buckingham Palace, including paintings from Sir Anthony van Dyck, Rembrandt and Peter Paul Reubens.
 2021 – Watercolour paintings from the personal collections of Queen Victoria and Prince Albert.
 2019/2020 – Drawings of Leonardo da Vinci. The exhibition was the largest collection of works by Leonardo assembled in Scotland to date.
 2019 – Russian art, including photographs, objects and paintings.

See also
 Queen's Gallery at Buckingham Palace

References

External links
 The Royal Collection: The Queen's Gallery, Palace of Holyroodhouse

Tourist attractions in Edinburgh
Art museums and galleries in Edinburgh
Category B listed buildings in Edinburgh
Art museums established in 2002
2002 establishments in Scotland
Former churches in Scotland